Daughter of the Sea may refer to:
 Daughter of the Sea (1953 film), a Spanish drama film
 Daughter of the Sea (1917 film), a Spanish silent film